The coxed four was a rowing event held at the Summer Olympics. The event was first held for men at the second modern Olympics in 1900. It was not held in 1904 or 1908. It returned in 1912 with two versions: the standard one as well as one with inriggers (the only time that version was held). It continued to be held for men until it was removed from the programme following the 1992 Games, at which point it and the men's coxed pair were replaced with the men's lightweight double sculls and men's lightweight coxless four. The women's event was added when women's rowing was added to the Olympic programme in 1976. It was held each year through 1988, when it was replaced with the women's coxless four.

Medalists

Men

Multiple medalists

Medalists by country

Women

Multiple medalists

Medalists by country

Men with Inriggers

References

Coxed four